Fountains Fell is a mountain in the Yorkshire Dales, England. Its subsidiary, Fountains Fell South Top reaches  and qualifies as a Nuttall.

The eastern slopes of the fell form part of the National Trust's Malham Tarn and Moor estate.

History
The name Fountains derives from ownership of the land in the 13th century by the Cistercian monks of Fountains Abbey ( to the east, near Ripon), who used it for sheep grazing. Coal was mined on the summit from 1790 to 1860, and was used for lead smelting in the area. There are various pits and shafts on and near the summit, and the remains of a coke oven building.

Pennine Way
The Pennine Way crosses Fountains Fell about a third of a mile north of the summit. It is  along the Pennine Way from Malham village to the summit of Fountains Fell, the route climbing up beside the dramatic cliffs of Malham Cove and passing Malham Tarn before climbing up the east side of the fell. The route continues down the western slopes of the fell and ascends the southern ridge of Pen-y-ghent, reached after : this summit of  then supplants Fountains Fell as the highest point yet reached on the Pennine Way.

Caving
There are several caves of interest to cavers on Fountains Fell, including Antler Hole, Dalehead Pot, Echo Hole, Fornagh Gill, Gingling Pot, Hammer Pot and Magnetometer Pot.

See also
Fountains Fell Tarn, a natural lake between the two peaks on Fountains Fell

References

External links 

Peaks of the Yorkshire Dales
Marilyns of England
Hewitts of England
Nuttalls
Craven District